Sir William Moore Johnson, 1st Baronet, KC, PC (1828 – 9 December 1918) was an Irish politician, barrister and judge. He was held in great affection by the Bar, despite a reputation for obtuseness which led to his nickname "Wooden-headed Billy". He was described as "a monument of kindness and stupidity".

He was the son of Rev. William Johnson, chancellor of the Diocese of Cloyne, and his wife Elizabeth Hamilton, daughter of the Rev. William Hamilton, Fellow of Trinity College Dublin. He was educated at Dublin University, entered Lincoln's Inn in 1849, and was called to the Irish Bar four years later. In 1872, he became a Queen's Counsel.

He was elected as a Liberal Member of Parliament (MP) for Mallow in County Cork in 1880, and held the seat until 1883. He also served as Solicitor General for Ireland from 1880 to 1881. In 1881, he was sworn a member of the Privy Council of Ireland and made Attorney General for Ireland. He remained Attorney General until 1883, when he was appointed a Justice of the Queen's Bench Division of the High Court of Justice in Ireland. He married Susan, daughter of Richard Bayly of Green Park, Kilmallock, the following year.

According to Maurice Healy, Johnson did not wish to become a judge (largely because Irish judges then were rather poorly paid). However, as Attorney General, he caused a furore when, on arriving in Court to prosecute Maurice's uncle Timothy Michael Healy, he publicly shook his hand, and the Crown felt that it would be better if he ceased to be a Law Officer.

As a judge he was notorious for his inability to get the facts of a case right, leading to the nickname "Wooden-headed Billy". Maurice Healy however adds that he was a fairly good lawyer and the kindest-hearted of men. In an era when many Irish judges, such as Hugh Holmes, Walter Boyd and William Drennan Andrews were noted for the severity of their sentences in criminal cases, Johnson was noted for his clemency.

At the Wexford assize in 1897, he expressed his horror at the brutal murder of James Kelly, a prosperous farmer from Kilcavan, the previous month. He told the grand jury that he would not comment on the case in detail since there had been no arrest. In fact, no arrest was ever made and the murder remains unsolved to this day.

He was created a Baronet (of Dublin) in the Baronetage of the United Kingdom on 24 November 1909 after his retirement from the court that year. The title became extinct on his death.

Arms

References

1828 births
1918 deaths
Alumni of Trinity College Dublin
Solicitors-General for Ireland
Attorneys-General for Ireland
Johnson of Dublin, 1st Baronet
Irish barristers
Irish Liberal Party MPs
Members of Lincoln's Inn
Members of the Privy Council of Ireland
Members of the Parliament of the United Kingdom for County Cork constituencies (1801–1922)
UK MPs 1880–1885
Judges of the High Court of Justice in Ireland